Miahuatlán Municipality is a Municipality in Veracruz, Mexico.

Geography
It is located in montane central zone of the State of Veracruz, about 28 km from state capital Xalapa. It has a surface of 20.56 km2. 

Miahuatlán Municipality is delimited to the north by Landero y Coss, to the east by Acatlán Municipality, to the south by Naolinco Municipality and to the west by Tonayán Municipality.

Products
It produces principally maize, rice and coffee.

Events
In  Miahuatlán , in march takes place the celebration in honor to San José, Patron of the town.

Weather
The weather in  Miahuatlán  is cold all year with rains in summer and autumn.

References

External links 

  Municipal Official webpage
  Municipal Official Information

Municipalities of Veracruz